Marco Tizza (born 6 February 1992 in Giussano) is an Italian cyclist, who currently rides for UCI ProTeam .

Major results

2014
 8th Piccolo Giro di Lombardia
2015
 8th Coppa della Pace
 10th Poreč Trophy
2016
 5th Memorial Marco Pantani
 6th Boucles de l'Aulne
 7th Grand Prix de Plumelec-Morbihan
 8th Coppa Ugo Agostoni
 8th Grand Prix Pino Cerami
 10th Giro dell'Appennino
2017
 4th Overall Ronde de l'Oise
 5th Overall Sibiu Cycling Tour
 6th Coppa Ugo Agostoni
2018
 2nd Volta Limburg Classic
 3rd Trofeo Matteotti
 5th Giro della Toscana
 9th Memorial Marco Pantani
2019
 1st Stage 5 Volta a Portugal
 4th Overall GP Beiras e Serra da Estrela
 9th Overall Sibiu Cycling Tour
1st Stage 3
 9th Grand Prix de Plumelec-Morbihan
 9th Grand Prix of Aargau Canton
 10th Gran Premio di Lugano
 10th Tour du Doubs
2020
 8th Trofeo Laigueglia
 9th Overall Sibiu Cycling Tour
 10th Giro dell'Appennino
2021
 7th Grand Prix of Aargau Canton
 9th Gran Premio di Lugano
2022
 5th Overall Boucles de la Mayenne
 10th Vuelta a Murcia
2023
 10th Overall Saudi Tour

References

External links

1992 births
Living people
Italian male cyclists
Cyclists from the Province of Monza e Brianza
People from Giussano